Tired Theodore (Swedish: Trötte Teodor) is a 1931 French-Swedish comedy film directed by Gustaf Edgren and starring Valdemar Dalquist, Karin Swanström and Brita Appelgren. It was shot at the Råsunda Studios in Stockholm. The film's sets were designed by the art director Arne Åkermark. It is based on the 1913 German play of the same title by Max Ferner and Max Neal which has been adapted for the screen a number of times. A separate French-language version Night Shift was also produced.

Cast
 Valdemar Dalquist as Teodor Hörneman
 Karin Swanström as 	Rosa Hörneman
 Håkan Westergren as 	Bertil Hörneman
 Brita Appelgren as 	Britta Kronfeldt
 Fritiof Billquist as 	Ivar Camillus
 Maritta Marke as 	Laura Camillus
 Anna-Lisa Baude as Frida
 Rune Carlsten as Isaac Mosesson
 Gucken Cederborg as 	Sarah Mosesson
 Julia Cæsar as 	Office clerk
 Eric Abrahamsson as 	Restaurant Guest 
 Harry Ahlin as 	Police Inspector's Assistant 
 Bertil Brusewitz as Police Inspector 
 Artur Cederborgh as 	Porter 
 Carl Deurell as 	Chief of Committee 
 Gösta Gustafson as Janitor Andersson 
 Frithiof Hedvall as 	Anderberg 
 Knut Lambert as 	Carl Mild 
 Yngve Nyqvist as Restaurateur 
 Ragnar Widestedt as 	Criminal

References

Bibliography 
 Qvist, Per Olov & von Bagh, Peter. Guide to the Cinema of Sweden and Finland. Greenwood Publishing Group, 2000.

External links 
 

1931 films
1931 comedy films
Swedish comedy films
1930s Swedish-language films
Swedish black-and-white films
Films directed by Gustaf Edgren
Swedish films based on plays
French films based on plays
French comedy films
1930s Swedish films
1930s French films